Cercospora brachypus is a fungal plant pathogen.

References

brachypus
Fungal plant pathogens and diseases